Core Molding Technologies, Inc. was founded in 1988 (its original name was Core Materials Corporation) and now based in Columbus, Ohio. The company manufactures sheet molding compounds (SMC), and molds fiberglass reinforced plastics. It occupies over 1,000,000 square feet of manufacturing space and its main subsidiaries are in Matamoros, Mexico, Gaffney, South Carolina, and Cincinnati, Ohio. In 2011, Core Molding Technologies formed Core Specialty Composites, LLC.

History 
1980:
The predecessor company Columbus Plastic Operations was set up.
1996:
The company (firstly named Core Materials Corporation) was set up and acquired Columbus Plastic Operations.
2002:
The company changed its name to Core Molding Technologies, Inc.
2011:
The company formed Core Specialty Composites, LLC

In March 2013, Core Molding Technologies, Inc. received a significant new business opportunity award from Volvo Group North America LLC.

Products and services
Core Molding Technologies specializes in large-format moldings and provides fiberglass processes, such as compression molding process (SMC, GMT), spray-up, hand lay-up, resin transfer molding (RTM), and reaction injection molding (RIM). Core Molding Technologies mainly produced fiber reinforced plastics and plastic composites such as shielding, vehicle roofs, hoods and so on. Besides, it also provides services for manufacturing and product development, such as custom material formulations, composite mold construction, design for manufacturability and so on.
Next Generation Product Released: Core Molding Technologies' Featherlite® SMC Production Reaches 10,000,000 lbs.

Operations

Research and development 
2011.2, The company introduced Featherlite® SMC, with a 1.43 sp.gr density, lighter than standard-density SMC (1.9 sp.gr). 
2012, The company introduced N-sulGuard® SMC to support Ag and Construction Equipment and Electrical markets.
2013.8, the company announced Airilite™, an ultra-low density SMC, about 1.18 sp.gr.
2013.10, the company announced the low-density Featherlite® SMC has reached 10,000,000 pounds. This also announced FeatherliteXL™ SMC, the company's second-generation advancement, began to develop.

Awards 
Core Molding Technologies, because of its stable supplies, was presented a "Supplier of the Year" award for 2012 by Kautex Textron GmbH & Co. KG., one of the 100 largest global automotive suppliers.

References

External links 
Official Core Molding Technologies, Inc website

Manufacturing companies based in Ohio
Manufacturing companies established in 1988
1988 establishments in Ohio
Companies listed on NYSE American